Nicotiana otophora is a perennial herbaceous plant. It is a wild species of tobacco native to the Andes Mountains of Bolivia and Argentina.

Tobacco taxonomy
Recent genetic evidence suggests the possibility that it is one of the parent species of the common domesticated tobacco (Nicotiana tabacum), which was hybridized along with the species Nicotiana sylvestris, and Nicotiana tomentosiformis.

The evidence for its parentage of Nicotiana tabacum is weaker at this time than it is for the other two species Nicotiana sylvestris, and Nicotiana tomentosiformis.

References

External links
 

otophora
Tobacco
Flora of Argentina
Flora of Bolivia
Flora of the Andes